Spring Valley is a census-designated place (CDP) in Yavapai County, Arizona, United States. The population was 1,019 at the 2000 census.

Geography

Spring Valley is located at  (34.342630, -112.159973).

Demographics

As of the census of 2000, there were 1,019 people, 427 households, and 283 families residing in the CDP. The racial makeup of the CDP was 97.0% White, 0.7% Black or African American, 0.3% Native American, 0.3% Asian, 0.1% Pacific Islander, 1.0% from other races, and 0.7% from two or more races.  4.7% of the population were Hispanic or Latino of any race.

There were 427 households, out of which 17.6% had children under the age of 18 living with them, 56.7% were married couples living together, 6.3% had a female householder with no husband present, and 33.7% were non-families. 28.1% of all households were made up of individuals, and 15.7% had someone living alone who was 65 years of age or older.  The average household size was 2.28 and the average family size was 2.79.

In the CDP, the population was spread out, with 23.1% under the age of 18, 3.4% from 18 to 24, 18.5% from 25 to 44, 28.3% from 45 to 64, and 26.7% who were 65 years of age or older.  The median age was 49 years. For every 100 females, there were 89.8 males.  For every 100 females age 18 and over, there were 95.0 males.

The median income for a household in the CDP was $25,924, and the median income for a family was $34,688. Males had a median income of $41,500 versus $23,047 for females. The per capita income for the CDP was $16,168.  About 1.8% of families and 10.9% of the population were below the poverty line, including 1.3% of those under age 18 and 12.8% of those age 65 or over.

Education

Residents are in the Mayer Unified School District.

Spring Ridge Academy is an all-girls boarding school, for troubled teens, that was founded in 1996.

References

External links

Census-designated places in Yavapai County, Arizona